Mohamed Ahmed 'Dayib Gurey" was a senior SNM senior commander who led the invasion of Hargeisa in the Somaliland War of Independence. Gurey also served as trade minister under Somaliland's first elected government under President Egal in 1993.

References 

Possibly living people
Year of birth missing
Somali National Movement
Somaliland politicians